"Bubble" is the sixth single by Japanese rock band Band-Maid, released in Japan on January 16, 2019, by Crown Stones. The song was used as the theme song for the Japanese drama show Perfect Crime. It was released on the same day as "Glory".

Composition and lyrics
The lyrics for "Bubble" were inspired by the manga Perfect Crime. Rhythm guitarist/vocalist Miku Kobato wrote the lyrics to be "good enough so that those who read the original would appreciate it". They were originally going to use one of their unreleased songs for the show, but lead guitarist Kanami Tōno "realized that the demo I just happened to be working on at the time was a better fit for the drama."

The lyrics for "Smile" were written as a thank you to their fans. The music was written by their long time collaborator, Kentaro Akutsu, because some of his compositions are considered popular by fans and they thought that their fans would enjoy another composition by him.

Critical reception
JaME said that the title track "...mixes slow parts with sudden adrenaline outbursts" and that "We bet you will return to this song over and over again for fuelling[sic] up." And said that "Smile"'s use of "...acoustic guitar and Saiki's warm vocal" "...creates a soft, cosy atmosphere, which wraps you up like a comfortable blanket, while the other instruments serve as support." Marc Bowie of J-Generation called the title track "...a typically melodic pounder" and that it "...features a crunching riff".

Music video
The music video for "Bubble" was released on January 15, 2019. The music video is a tribute to the Queen biographical film Bohemian Rhapsody.

Live performances
Live versions of "Bubble" were later released on their video albums Band-Maid World Domination Tour [Shinka] at Line Cube Shibuya (Shibuya Public Hall) and Band-Maid Online Okyu-Ji (Feb. 11, 2021).

Track listing
CD

Credits and personnel
Band-Maid members
 Misa – bass
 Miku Kobato – vocals, guitar
 Saiki Atsumi – vocals
 Akane Hirose – drums
 Kanami Tōno – guitar

Recording and management
 Recorded at Nasoundra Palace Studio
 Recording engineer: Masyoshi Yamamoto
 Mixed at Mix Forest
 Mix engineer: Masahiko Fukui
 Mastered by Masahiko Fukui
 Design by Akira Yamaguchi, Kazu Yamamoto, Misaki Fujioka

Charts

Release history

References

External links 
 Discography – Band-Maid official website

2019 singles
Band-Maid songs
Japanese-language songs
Japanese television drama theme songs